Eliki (before 1917: Ζευγολατιό - Zevgolatio), is a village in the municipal unit of Diakopto, Achaea, Greece. It was named after the nearby ancient town Helike. Eliki is located near the river Selinountas and the Gulf of Corinth. Nea Keryneia is adjacent to the east. Eliki had a population of 516 in 2011, including the small village Kalanteri. The Greek National Road 8A (Athens - Corinth - Patras) passes south of the village.

Population

See also
List of settlements in Achaea

References

External links
 Eliki on GTP Travel Pages
 Eliki in www.ediakopto.gr

Aigialeia
Diakopto
Populated places in Achaea